Najran Sport Club is a Saudi Arabian football team based in Najran Province, they are currently playing in the Saudi First Division.

Najran SC achieved promotion to the Saudi Premier League by finishing 2nd in the Saudi First Division during the 2006–07 season.

The beginning
Najran Club is a new club compared to other Saudi clubs. The idea of establishing the club was first born in 1980 when a group of Najranis raised a request to the Youth Welfare office expressing their desire in establishing a club that carried the name of their city. Efforts were harnessed to achieve this quest that was just an idea till the approval of the general president of the Youth Welfare at that time, his royal highness prince Faisal bin Fahad bin Abdulaziz was issued. Accordingly, the founders of the club held a meeting to form and elect the first board of directors.

Achievements

The Najran team was able to reach the final match of the prince Faisal Bin Fahad cup 2005–06 for the first division.

The Najran team was finally able to qualify to the Saudi Premier League in the 2007–08 season, and is still playing in it to this day.

They were able to reach the final four in the 2009–10 Saudi Crown Prince Cup after defeating some of the strongest teams in Saudi football such as Al-Ittihad, but lost to Al-Hilal 1–2 after an impressive display.

Current squad 
As of 6 September 2021:

Out on loan

Managers
 Mourad Okbi (August 1, 2002 – April 30, 2004)
 Rashed ben Ammar (September 25, 2004 – May 30, 2005)
 Fathi Al-Jabal (August 7, 2005 – March 12, 2007)
 Yahya Khuraim (caretaker) (March 12, 2007 – March 23, 2007)
 Samir Sellimi (March 23, 2007 – May 30, 2007)
 Lotfi Benzarti (May 28, 2007 – December 21, 2007)
 Ivica Todorov (December 23, 2007 – May 1, 2008)
 Costică Ștefănescu (July 1, 2008 – December 21, 2008)
 Mokhtar Tlili (January 9, 2009 – May 1, 2009)
 Marcelo Zuleta (July 22, 2009 – October 6, 2009)
 Samir Jouili (October 6, 2009 – January 11, 2010)
 Mourad Okbi (January 11, 2010 – October 30, 2010)
 José Rachão (October 30, 2010 – June 30, 2011)
 Gjoko Hadžievski (July 1, 2011 – May 6, 2012)
 Miodrag Ješić (May 31, 2012 – January 2, 2013)
 Khemais Labidi (January 6, 2013 – March 1, 2013)
 Al Hasan Al-Yami (caretaker) (March 1, 2013 – March 6, 2013)
 Gjoko Hadžievski (March 6, 2013 – January 9, 2014)
 Nizar Mahrous (January 10, 2014 – June 1, 2014)
 Denis Lavagne (June 8, 2014 – August 24, 2014)
 Marc Brys (August 25, 2014 – September 24, 2014)
 Abdelhay Laatiri (caretaker) (September 24, 2014 – October 8, 2014)
 Fouad Bouali (October 8, 2014 – May 19, 2015)
 Fathi Al-Jabal (June 27, 2015 – December 17, 2015)
 Al Hasan Al-Yami (caretaker) (December 17, 2015 – December 28, 2015)
 Hélio dos Anjos (December 28, 2015 – May 23, 2016)
 Ahmed Hafez (July 15, 2016 – September 25, 2016)
 Mohammed Al-Ayari (September 25, 2016 – February 8, 2018)
 Adel Latrach (February 9, 2018 – March 23, 2018)
 Ramzy El Morsy (March 23, 2018 – May 4, 2018)
 Hamood Al-Saiari (May 8, 2018 – May 31, 2018)
 Zvezdan Milošević (June 13, 2018 – September 21, 2018)
 Ramzy El Morsy (caretaker) (September 21, 2018 – October 3, 2018)
 Habib Ben Romdhane (October 3, 2018 – June 1, 2019)
 Heron Ferreira (June 22, 2019 – November 8, 2019)
 Ramzy El Morsy (caretaker) (November 8, 2019 – November 14, 2019)
 Chokri Khatoui (November 14, 2019 – June 23, 2020)
 Abdullah Al Haidar (June 23, 2020 – September 21, 2020)
 Paulo Gomes (October 18, 2020 – February 5, 2021)
 Bandar Basraih (February 5, 2021 – June 1, 2021)
 Saïd Saïbi (June 21, 2021 – October 21, 2021)
 Abdullah Al Haidar (caretaker) (October 21, 2021 – November 5, 2021)
 Afouène Gharbi (November 6, 2021 – September 19, 2022)
 Laurent Hagist (September 22, 2022 – February 3, 2023)
 Gjoko Hadžievski (February 3, 2023 – )

References

External links
  Official website

Najran
Najran
Najran
Najran
Najran